Rang Maza Vegla is a Marathi Indian soap opera created and produced by Ekta Kapoor under her banner Balaji Telefilms. The series premiered on 2 April 2012 and aired on Saam TV.

Plot
The series revolves around a young protagonist Gargi (Tanvi Palav) who is born and brought up in United States. She comes to India after 18 years to reunite with her grandparents. The series explores how Gargi takes up responsibilities when her family is struck in crisis.

Cast
 Shashank Ketkar
 Sharvani Pillai
 Shilpa Navalkar
 Tanvi Palav as Gargi
 Anand Kale
 Nandini Vaidya
 Lala Deshmukh
 Shrikant Gandhe
 Vasudha Deshpande
 Arun Bhadsavle
 Falguni Thakkar
 Abhilasha Patil
 Mrunmayee Phadke
 Yogita Dandekar

References

External links
 Official Website

Balaji Telefilms television series
2012 Indian television series debuts
2012 Indian television series endings
Marathi-language television shows
Saam TV original programming